Hilgendorf is a surname of German origin. People with that name include:

 Eric Hilgendorf (born 1960), German professor of law and legal philosopher
 Franz Martin Hilgendorf (1839–1904), German zoologist and paleontologist
 Hilgendorf's saucord, a rockfish
 Hilgendorf's tube-nosed bat
 Frederick Hilgendorf (1874–1942), New Zealand teacher, lecturer and agricultural scientist
 James Hilgendorf (born 1982), Australian rugby union player
 Tom Hilgendorf (born 1942), American former professional baseball player

See also
 

German-language surnames